Arab Kheyl or Arab Khil may refer to:
 Arab Kheyl, Amol
 Arab Kheyl, Babolsar
 Arab Kheyl, Chalus
 Arab Kheyl, Sari